This is a list of historic properties in Wickenburg, Arizona, which includes a photographic gallery of some of the towns historic structures. Some of these structures are listed in the National Register of Historic Places. Others are listed as historical by the Wickenburg Chamber of Commerce. Also included are the photographs of the Vulture Mine and of various of the remaining properties and ruins of Vulture City, a ghost town situated at the site of the defunct Vulture Mine. These include the Vulture Mine–Assay office, built in 1884, Henry Wickenburg's Settlers Home and Rita's Brothel.

Brief history

The Vulture Mine was a gold mine which was discovered in 1863. It was the most productive gold mine in the history of Arizona. From 1863 to 1942, the mine produced 340,000 ounces of gold and 260,000 ounces of silver.
The Vulture mine was discovered when Henry Wickenburg,  a prospector from California's gold rush, stumbled upon a quartz deposit containing gold while traveling in Arizona. Wickenburg began mining the outcrop himself.

In 1863, after Henry Wickenburg discovered the Vulture mine, Vulture City, a small mining town, was established in the area. Vulture City's post office was established on October 4, 1880, and Henry Wickenburg was the town's first Post Master. The town had more than five boarding houses and several buildings. The huge Vulture Mine-Assay Office building, built in 1884, still stands today. The town also had cookhouse and mess hall plus stores, saloons and even a school. 
The town once had a population of 5,000 citizens. The town was marked by violence. Eighteen men were hung on an ironwood tree located by the ruins of Henry Wickenburg's house.

In 1863, miners, ranchers and farmers who built their homes along the fertile plain of the Hassayampa River, also founded the town of Wickenburg. Along the town's main historic district, early businesses built many structures that still form Wickenburg's downtown area.

The fact that a property is listed in the National Register of Historic Places does not guarantee that the owner of the same will not have the property demolished. Unfortunately many of the historic sites are in grave danger of collapsing or destruction. According to Jim McPherson, Arizona Preservation Foundation Board President: "It is crucial that residents, private interests, and government officials act now to save these elements of our cultural heritage before it is too late."

The following structures serve as examples of historic properties which no longer exist.
 The Santa Fe Bunk House – Listed in 1986; reference #86003761.
 The Sunset Telephone Co. – Listed in 1986; reference #86003863.
 The PJ Thompson House – Listed in 1986; reference #86001591.
 The Masonic Hall – Listed in 1986; reference #86001583.
 The Wickenburg Ice and Cold Storage – Listed in 1986; reference #86001596.

Historic Structures
The following photographs are of some of the historic structures in Wickenburg listed in the National Register of Historic Places National Register of Historic Places.

The following photographs are of some of the historic structures in Wickenburg listed in the Wickenburg Chamber of Commerce.

Further reading
 "Arizona's Haunted History"; by: Jill Pascoe; Publisher: Irongate Press; 
 "Ghost Towns and Historical Haunts in Arizona"; Publisher: Golden West Publishers; 
 "Wickenburg (Images of America)"; by: Lynn Downey; Publisher: Arcadia Publishing; 
 "Wickenburg Will and the Jail Tree: An Outlaw's Tale"; by: Patrick H. Boles; Publisher: CreateSpace Independent Publishing Platform;

See also

 Wickenburg Massacre
 National Register of Historic Places listings in Maricopa County, Arizona

References

Wickenburg
Wickenburg
History of Maricopa County, Arizona
Cemeteries in Arizona